KRUU-LP (100.1 FM) was a 100-watt non-commercial low-power community radio station operating in Fairfield, Iowa. The station was partially solar powered. KRUU-LP was an open source, independent radio, listener-supported station and served a broadcast radius of approximately ten miles.

History
Originally granted a construction permit to build a low power radio station with the call letters KRUU-LP by the FCC in 2001, the Fairfield Youth Advocacy, a.k.a. the Beatbox, a 501(c)3 non-profit organization, was granted a six-month extension in April 2006. At that time, a town hall meeting was held and the board of directors was formed. The station debuted on air on September 30, 2006.

In September 2009, KRUU-LP became the first partially solar-powered radio station in the midwest United States. According to KRUU-LP, solar panels reduced its reliance on the conventional electrical grid by 15% to 20% percent and powered the master control room and transmitter. The operation included twenty-four Photocomm solar panels and battery backup was used during inclement weather.

The station's license expired February 1, 2021.

References

External links
 KRUU website
 Linux Journal article
 Creative Commons article
 Iowa Source article
 Ottumwa Courier article
 Green Iowa article

RUU-LP
RUU-LP
Defunct community radio stations in the United States
Defunct radio stations in the United States
Radio stations disestablished in 2021
2021 disestablishments in Iowa
Defunct mass media in Iowa
Radio stations established in 2006
2006 establishments in Iowa